John Esmonde may refer to:

 John Esmonde (1937–2008), of the comedy scriptwriting duo Esmonde and Larbey
 Several members of the family of the Esmonde baronets of Clonegall, a title in the Baronetcy of Ireland, including:
 Sir John Esmonde, 5th Baronet (died 1758) 
 Dr John Esmonde (United Irishman), briefly 7th Baronet, (died by hanging 1798)	
 Sir John Esmonde, 10th Baronet (1826–1876), MP for County Waterford 1852–1876
Sir John Esmonde, 14th Baronet (1893–1958), Fine Gael TD for Wexford 1937–1951
 Sir John Esmonde, 16th Baronet (1928–1987), Fine Gael TD for Wexford 1973–1977
 John Joseph Esmonde (1862—1915), MP for North Tipperary 1910–1915, nephew of Sir John Esmonde, 10th Baronet